Garcia Moniz, o Gasco (died 1066 or 1068), was a medieval Knight, he participated in Christian crusades against the Moors.

He was the son of Munio Viegas and Mancellos.  He was married to Elvira.

Garcia Moniz, o Gasco died fighting the Moors, during the campaign of conquest of Ribadouro.

References 

11th-century births
1060s deaths
11th-century Portuguese people
Medieval Portuguese nobility
Portuguese Roman Catholics